Carl Gustav of Sweden - English also often: Charles Gustavus ; Swedish also: Karl Gustav - may refer to:

Carl X Gustav, King of Sweden 1654–1660
Carl XVI Gustaf, King of Sweden from 1973–Present
Carl Gustav, Prince of Sweden 1686, son of King Carl XI (died in infancy)
Carl Gustav, Prince of Sweden 1782, son of till King Gustav III (died in infancy)
Carl Gustav, Prince of Sweden 1802, son of till King Gustav IV Adolph (died in infancy)